Ernstichthys megistus is a species of banjo catfish found in Ecuador and Peru where it occurs in the Bobonaza and Marañon River basins.

References

External links 
 

Aspredinidae
Freshwater fish of Ecuador
Freshwater fish of Peru
Fish described in 1961